The 2001–02 Logan Cup was a first-class cricket competition held in Zimbabwe from 15 February 2002 – 19 April 2002. It was won by Mashonaland, who won all five of their matches to top the table with 86 points.

Points table

References

2002 in Zimbabwean cricket
Domestic cricket competitions in 2001–02
Logan Cup